Buffalo Peak is a mountain summit in the Kenosha Mountains range of the Rocky Mountains of North America. Buffalo Peak is the highest point in Jefferson County, Colorado.

Mountain

Historical names
Buffalo Peak - 1906 
Freemans Peak

See also

List of mountain peaks of Colorado
List of Colorado county high points

References

External links

Mountains of Colorado
Mountains of Jefferson County, Colorado
Pike National Forest
North American 3000 m summits